IL-18, IL 18 or IL18 may refer to:
 Interleukin 18, a protein encoded in humans by the IL18 gene
 Ilyushin Il-18, a Cold War–era Soviet airliner and military transport
 Illinois's 18th congressional district, a defunct U.S. House district
 Illinois Route 18, a rural east–west state road in central Illinois